Totally Clueless is an American hidden camera game show on MTV that premiered on October 22, 2012.

Cast
 Kristen Acimovic
 Giulio Gallarotti
 Alison Bennett
 James Manzello
 Patrice M. Harris
 Nico Elicerio

Episodes

References

External links
 
 

2010s American reality television series
2012 American television series debuts
2012 American television series endings
English-language television shows
American hidden camera television series
MTV original programming
MTV weekday shows
2010s American comedy game shows